Justin Aldrich Rockefeller (born July 12, 1979) is an American impact investor and financial technology professional. He is a great-great grandson of John D. Rockefeller. 

Rockefeller was born on July 12, 1979, in West Virginia, the youngest son of former West Virginia senator, Jay Rockefeller (b. 1937), and his wife, Sharon Percy Rockefeller (b. 1944). Rockefeller's maternal grandfather was former U.S. Senator Charles H. Percy (1919–2011), and his paternal grandparents were Blanchette Ferry Hooker (1909–1992) and John D. Rockefeller III (1906–1978), the eldest son of philanthropists John D. Rockefeller Jr. and Abby Aldrich Rockefeller.

Career

Rockefeller is the global director of family offices and foundations at Addepar, a financial technology company.

Rockefeller co-founded and chairs the board of directors of The ImPact a membership network of family enterprises (family offices, foundations, and businesses) that are committed to making investments with measurable social impact. 

From 2009 to 2018, Rockefeller served on the board and the investment committee of the Rockefeller Brothers Fund; in those capacities, he helped the private foundation align its endowment with its mission.  He also serves on the board of Japan Society, and speaks occasionally about impact investing, family offices, and technology, including at the World Economic Forum at Davos, Milken Institute, and Young Presidents' Organization.

Previously, Justin was venture partner at Richmond Global, LLC, a global venture capital firm focusing on technology-enabled services and mobile technologies in the U.S. and across major emerging markets.

Justin's previous board memberships include: Voxiva; Rockefeller Family Fund; Population Council; the International Council of The Museum of Modern Art; the Alliance for the Arts; and Generation Engage, which he cofounded in 2004. He also served on the National Leadership Council for GLSEN – the Gay, Lesbian, Straight Education Network, and on the NY State Commission on National and Community Service.

Personal life
In 2006, Rockefeller, who lives in New York City, married Indré Vengris, a dancer and fashion executive. Her father, Vitolis Enrikas Vengris, was born in Akademija, Kaunas in Lithuania, and came to Iowa in 1968 as a student. He became a naturalized U.S. citizen in 1973. Justin and Indré reside in New York City and have one daughter.

Rockefeller graduated from St. Albans School in 1998 and Princeton University in 2002.

See also
Rockefeller family
Jay Rockefeller
Sharon Percy Rockefeller
Charles H. Percy

References

Rockefeller family
Winthrop family
1979 births
Living people
Princeton University alumni
People from Pocahontas County, West Virginia
Businesspeople from New York City
American people of English descent
American people of German descent
American venture capitalists
St. Albans School (Washington, D.C.) alumni
Businesspeople from West Virginia